Benjamin Franklin Jones (August 8, 1824 – May 19, 1903) was a pioneer of the iron and steel industry in Pittsburgh.  Originally involved in the river barge industry, he purchased a share in American Iron Works in 1851, along with Bernard Lauth.   He later joined with James H. Laughlin to form Jones and Laughlin Steel Company, a steel mill heavily dependent on river transportation. The B.F. Jones Memorial Library in Aliquippa Pennsylvania, the site of J&L Steel's Aliquippa Works, was built in his honor with funds donated by his daughter.

Biography
He was born on August 8, 1824 in Claysville, Pennsylvania. He married Mary McMasters and had a son, Benjamin Franklin Jones, Jr. From 1884 to 1888 he was chairman of the Republican National Committee. He died on May 19, 1903 in Allegheny City, Pennsylvania.

Legacy
He was executor of Laughlin's estate.

Politics
As chairman of the Republican National Committee 1884 to 1888, he was responsible for the James G. Blaine presidential campaign.

See also
Benjamin Franklin Jones Cottage
B. F. Jones House

References

1824 births
1903 deaths
American industrialists
American steel industry businesspeople
Burials at Allegheny Cemetery
Businesspeople from Pennsylvania
Pennsylvania Republicans
People from Washington County, Pennsylvania
Republican National Committee chairs
19th-century American businesspeople